Alaattin Özgür (born 22 January 1965) is a Turkish former wrestler who competed in the 1984 Summer Olympics.

References

External links
 

1965 births
Living people
Olympic wrestlers of Turkey
Wrestlers at the 1984 Summer Olympics
Turkish male sport wrestlers